Samaritan: The Mitch Snyder Story is a 1986 American television film directed by Richard T. Heffron and starring Martin Sheen as homeless activist Mitch Snyder.

Cast
Martin Sheen as Mitch Snyder
Cicely Tyson as Muriel
Roxanne Hart as Carol Fennelly
Stan Shaw as Harold Moss
Joe Seneca as Reverend
James Avery as Hank Dudney
Guy Boyd as Tom
Janet Carroll as Susan Baker
Jordan Charney as Pete Stark
Brett Cullen as Billy
Conchata Ferrell as Ida Sinclair
James Handy as Melvin Mander
Matthew Laurance as Max
Dey Young as Cathleen
Tim Russ
John Wesley
Ron Canada as D.C. Police Officer

Accolade
For her performance in the film, Cicely Tyson won the NAACP Image Award for Outstanding Actress in a Television Movie, Mini-Series or Dramatic Special.

References

External links
 
 

American biographical films
Films set in the 20th century
1986 films
1986 television films
1980s biographical films
CBS network films
Films directed by Richard T. Heffron
Films scored by Craig Safan
1980s English-language films
1980s American films